Events from the year 1770 in Canada.

Incumbents
Monarch: George III

Governors
Governor of the Province of Quebec: Guy Carleton
Governor of Nova Scotia: Lord William Campbell
Commodore-Governor of Newfoundland: John Byron
Governor of St. John's Island: Walter Patterson

Events
 December – Samuel Hearne departs on his third voyage of discovery
 The city of Saint-Eustache, Quebec is established

Births

April 7 – William Wordsworth, in Cockermouth, England (d.1850) 
April 30 – David Thompson, fur trader, surveyor and map-maker (d.1857)
June 4 (baptised) – William Carson, in Kirkcudbright, Scotland (d.1843) 
October 23 – George Ramsay, 9th Earl of Dalhousie (d.1838)

Full date unknown
William Allan, near Huntly, Scotland (d.1853)

Deaths
February 12 – Christopher Middleton, Hudson's Bay Company captain

Historical documents
Hard winters and scarcity of farm staples and manufactures useful in Britain make northern colonies dependent on West Indies, not mother country

Warships will form line from Cape Race, Newfoundland to latitude of Cape Cod to prevent smuggling to St. Lawrence, Nova Scotia coast and Massachusetts

British in Quebec request general assembly to encourage agriculture and trade and attach increasingly poor Canadians to economy and British law

Canadians request return of their laws, which are basis of their property and family rule, and public office from which they are humiliatingly excluded

Reward of $200 offered for information on "the Malefactors and abominable people that have, and attempt yet every Day, to set Fire to this Town"

Since surveyor appointed, small number of chimney fires shows benefit of chimney law, and minding fireplaces may save "us from that dreadful Calamity"

Lightning coming down chimney to fireplace she was kneeling at kills woman in Charlebourg, her last words being "My God, I am dying: Help"

After saying he would kill his wife to priest (and requesting he "assist him at the Gallows"), Quebec man attempts murder and then kills himself

Coroner's inquest finds Catharine Alexander's stillborn baby was given for burial to "ignorant Woman [who] indecently" put coffin in snow behind prison

Advertisement for shipping on Lakes Ontario, Erie and Huron - "infinitely less liable to hazard" than going "defenceless[...]to be seized by the Savages"

Illinois Country whites (pop. ca. 2,000) have connections with Canada and local Indigenous people, and tend to trade and hunt more than farm

Dinner given at Northwest Arm near Halifax in celebration of Festival of St. Aspinquid, with toasts to Hendrick, Uncas, Massasoit and other sachems

Nova Scotia townships must support only resident poor people and orphans, excepting poor and disabled people who can be supported by family

Needy "dissenting Ministers" of Nova Scotia will benefit from interest earned on charitable fund "warmly recommended" by 28 such clergymen in London

Interest on loans in Nova Scotia to be no higher than 6% (with grandfather clause) and lenders charging higher rate are to pay triple value of loan made

St. John's Island looking for fishers to settle, where they will pay no duty on rum, molasses "or any other Commodity necessary for Fishermen"

George Cartwright's sighting of Beothuk evokes long description of them and Newfoundlanders' murderous attitude toward them (Note: "wild" used)

St. John's merchants tell Gov. Byron Newfoundland trade suffers from previous governor, worker neglect, loss of settlers, drinking, and customs delays

Church of the Brethren missionaries establish selves among "Esquimaux" in Labrador with view to settlement (Note: stereotypes of Indigenous people)

Moravian missionary purchases land from head Inuk in each tent because "you are all Lords + Masters[...], each of you says He is Master of the Land"

After Inuit men of "Esquimaux Bay" acknowledge violence of past, missionary consults with them on where Moravians should build their house

Inuit acknowledge that they are Brethren's children and must attend their meetings and do what they are told to do

George Cartwright describes construction of Inuit sled made of spruce planks, whale jaw bone runners and walrus hide thongs

Samuel Hearne on expedition is irked but not dismayed by ways of his Indigenous guide ("Con-ne-e-quese"; Note: "niggard" means ungenerous person)

Hearne quotes Indigenous leader Matonabbee as saying women are made for labour, such as carrying, hauling, making and mending clothing etc.

Hearne describes moose hide tent and its use as woodland tipi early on his expedition northwest from Prince of Wales Fort, Churchill

References

 
Canada
70